Toxotrypana is an obsolete genus of tephritid  or fruit flies in the family Tephritidae, now Anastrepha

References

Trypetinae
Tephritidae genera